Gyptidium is a genus of South American flowering plants in the family Asteraceae.

 Species
 Gyptidium militare (B.L.Rob.) R.M.King & H.Rob. - Argentina (Formosa + Chaco Provinces)
 Gyptidium trichobasis (Baker) R.M.King & H.Rob. - Brazil (States of Paraná + Santa Catarina)

References

Flora of South America
Asteraceae genera
Eupatorieae